Gary Farrant (born 7 September 1946) is a former Australian rules footballer for North Melbourne Football Club and was a regular defender during the late 1960s until 1971. 

During 1972 he went back to his home club Cohuna Football Club and also return to his farming commitments. However, he was persuaded by Ron Barassi to come back to the club and returned to the club in 1973. Gary Farrant was a member of North Melbourne's first VFL Premiership, where he played at centre half back. This was his final year at North Melbourne. He also had a brother Doug Farrant, who was a forward at North Melbourne.

References
 

1946 births
Australian rules footballers from Victoria (Australia)
North Melbourne Football Club players
North Melbourne Football Club Premiership players
Living people
One-time VFL/AFL Premiership players